European Trophy Junior (previously named Nordic Trophy Junior between 2007 and 2009) was the junior edition of the European Trophy ice hockey tournament. European Trophy Junior was for ice hockey players younger than the age of 20. It was played in August every year. The tournament was cancelled after 2010.

Participating clubs 
The 2010 edition featured 10 teams from Sweden, Finland, Austria, Norway and the Czech Republic.

Winners

External links

See also 
 European Trophy, the main tournament

 
Ice hockey tournaments in Europe
Awards established in 2007
Organizations established in 2007
Organizations disestablished in 2010
Defunct multi-national ice hockey leagues in Europe
Junior ice hockey competitions